Anacrusis ruptimacula is a species of moth of the  family Tortricidae. It is found in Ecuador in Loja and Napo provinces.

References

Moths described in 1904
Atteriini
Moths of South America